Distinktion: Journal of Social Theory is a triannual peer-reviewed academic journal covering social and political theory. The editor-in-chief is Christian Borch (Copenhagen Business School). It was established in 2000 and is published by Taylor & Francis.

Abstracting and indexing 
Distinktion is abstracted and indexed in:

Emerging Sources Citation Index
EBSCO databases
ProQuest
Scopus
Sociological Abstracts
Worldwide Political Science Abstracts

References

External links

First use in the real world

Political science journals
Sociology journals
Routledge academic journals
Triannual journals
English-language journals
Publications established in 2000